Mary McCartney Macqueen (29 January 1912 – 15 September 1994) was an Australian artist who was known for her drawing, printmaking and mixed media works on paper. Her artistic style was expressive, gestural and experimental.

Life, training and influences 

Macqueen was born in Carlton, Victoria on 29 January 1912. Inspired by her grandmothers drawings, and encouraged by her parents, Macqueen developed a love for drawing from early childhood. Her primary and secondary schooling was at the Princes Hill State School, Mount Albert Central School and the Methodist Ladies College in Melbourne. She studied commercial art for one year in 1927 at the Swinburne Technical College, and then took private drawing classes with Catherine Hardess in 1928 at Hawthorn.

In 1930, at the age of eighteen, she married Allan Macqueen, an older man who was a widower with two sons. Over the ensuing ten years she did very little drawing and was instead occupied with raising three children, a daughter and two sons, who were born between 1931 and 1935. In 1939 Macqueen resumed her drawing and also began to experiment with watercolour painting. In 1941 she returned to Swinburne Technical College to study with William Dargie for a term. Her subject matter during this period consisted of everyday domestic scenes at her home, and the buildings, landscapes and people of Melbourne. In March 1945 she held her first solo exhibition of watercolours at the Kozminsky Galleries in Melbourne. In 1946 she attended drawing sessions with George Bell, who spoke to her about Cubism, Georges Braque and Rauol Dufy. However, her intuitive drawing style was at odds with his highly structural approach and she ceased the lessons when her fourth child was born.

Between 1956 and 1958 Mcqueen attended printmaking classes at the Royal Melbourne Technical College, now RMIT University, where she developed a fascination for lithography. To be able to print at home, she converted an old hand mangle into a press, which she continued to use throughout her artistic career. As her printmaking skills and experience increased she was asked to teach for one day a week at RMIT. This was later expanded to include instructing students in free drawing techniques. She taught at RMIT for more than a decade.

In the 1960s, Macqueen began to focus on animals as the subject matter for her work. She often visited the Melbourne Zoo to draw animals from life and was particularly fond of drawing giraffes. After her husband died in September 1970 she embarked on several overseas trips, which included visits to England, Mexico, Kenya, Bangladesh, Canada and the United States. These travel experiences contributed to the 1980s being described by Macqueen as "the decade which was to become the most interesting and productive in my life".

Mary Macqueen died at the age of 82 on 15 September 1994.

Style and works 

Mary Macqueen's artistic style was typically spontaneous, expressive and gestural. She specialised in line drawing, lithography and mixed media works on paper. Her most successful line drawings efficiently distill the character and essential qualities of her subject matter, which included animals, landscapes and scenes of domestic life. Throughout her career she sought to draw the perfect line. Macqueen believed that "a good pure-line drawing takes every ounce of concentration and effort and is a rare achievement".

In the 1970s, the discovery of handmade Nepalese paper in a Buddhist shop was a crucial moment for MacQueen, as it allowed her to explore drawing on the reverse of the paper to create soft translucent colours and delicate tonal washes. A 1988 exhibition of paper works at the Powell Street Gallery, Melbourne consisted of ink, gouache and collage works on Nepalese paper, notably omitting her line drawings. Many of the works were based on scenes from countries she had visited, and they demonstrate the breadth of her experimentation with the medium. Her work in the exhibition shows influences of Cubism and Fauvism.

Accomplishments

Awards 

Macqueen was the recipient of numerous prizes, including

 Victorian College of the Arts Drawing prize, 1957
 May Day prize for drawing, 1958
 Mornington Peninsula Regional Gallery Portland prize, 1965
 Spring festival of Drawing (work acquired), 1973
 Ronald award, Latrobe Valley Arts Centre, 1973
 Maitland prize for prints, 1974
 F. E. Richardson prize (for watercolours), Geelong, 1976.

Selected solo exhibitions 

The exact number of Macqueen's solo exhibitions is uncertain. Some sources cite "about 26" and others "just under 30"

 1945 Kozminsky Galleries Melbourne
 1948, 1950 Georges Gallery, Melbourne
 1967, 1969, 1971, 1974 Crossley Gallery, Melbourne
 1973, 1983, 1984, 1985, 1988 Powell Street Gallery, Melbourne
 1976, 1978, 1980 Stuart Gerstmann Gallery, Melbourne
 1975, 1977, 1979, 1981, 1982 Ray Hughes Gallery, Brisbane
 1981, 1983, 1986 Tynte Gallery, Adelaide
 1986, 1989, 1991, 1993 Charles Nodrum Gallery, Melbourne

Selected group exhibitions 

 1943 – 1957 Victorian Artists Society
 1956 The Arts Festival, Olympic Games, Melbourne
 1960 – 1964 Contemporary Art Society Annual Exhibitions
 1963 Australian Print Survey, Travelling exhibition to all State Galleries
 1966 Australian Prints Today, Smithsonian Institution, Washington D. C
 1971 Contemporary Australian Prints, Auckland City Art Gallery
 1975 Recent Drawings, National Gallery of Victoria
 1977 Selection of 41 Modern Prints from Australia, Japan Print Association, Tokyo
 1981 Spring Festival of Drawing, Mornington Peninsula Arts Centre
 1982 The College Show, V.A.B. Regional Development program, travelling exhibition to East Coast Regional Galleries
 1983 Australian Perspecta, Art Gallery of New South Wales
 1984 The Australians, C.D.S. Gallery, New York
 1985 Half in the Sky, Australian Women Artists, Art Gallery South Australia

Represented 

Macqueen is represented in many major Australian art galleries such as the National Gallery of Australia, National Gallery of Victoria, Art Gallery of New South Wales, Queensland Art Gallery and numerous regional Australian art galleries. Numerous works are also held in the Cruthers Collection of Women's Art.

Further reading 

 https://trove.nla.gov.au/work/33531464?q=Mary+MacQueen+art&c=book&versionId=41218298
 https://trove.nla.gov.au/work/19133695?selectedversion=NBD2337357
 Imprint No. 4, 1977.
 Art & Australia Vol. 1, No. 4, 1964.
 Art & Australia Vol. 16, No. 3, 1979.
 Art & Australia Vol. 19, No. 2, 1981.
 B. Seidel, Printmaking, 'Art in Australia' series, 1965.
 Eagle & Minchin, The George Bell School, Melbourne, 1981.

References 

1912 births
1994 deaths
20th-century Australian women artists
20th-century Australian artists
Artists from Melbourne
Australian lithographers
Australian printmakers
RMIT University alumni
Academic staff of RMIT University
Women lithographers
People from Carlton, Victoria
20th-century lithographers